Kalanchoe laciniata, commonly known as the christmas tree plant or cathedral bells, is a small plant which  is native to the Arabian Peninsula, Eritrea, and the Middle East but it also can be found in parts of India and Sri Lanka.

Kalanchoe laciniata is a succulent plant with reddish erect simple stems, with fleshy green leaves.

References

Flora of Sri Lanka
laciniata
Plants described in 1802
Flora of India (region)